USS DeLong may refer to the following ships of the United States Navy:
 , a torpedo boat, launched in 1900 and sold in 1920
 , a Wickes-class destroyer, launched in 1918 and sold in 1922
 , a Rudderow-class destroyer escort, launched in 1943 and struck in 1969

United States Navy ship names